Jungle Fish 2 is a 2010 South Korean youth television series starring Hong Jong-hyun and Park Ji-Yeon, Lee Joon, Han Ji-woo, Shin So-yu and Kim Bo-ra. It is based on the teen drama Jungle Fish that aired in 2008. The series ran on KBS2 from 4 November to 30 December 2010.

An audition was held in July 2010 to recruit the actors, more than 1,100 teenagers applied for the roles. The show was a commercial success scoring higher ratings than its prequel; and was well-received by both teenagers and critics. It is also one of KBS's most-watched series online of all time.

The series was edited into a theatrical feature film released on March 3, 2011.

Summary 
Hyo-ahn, the ace of Gahwa high school, apparently committed suicide by jumping off a five-story building. Ho-soo, who had broken off their relationship the day before, wants to know why. Rumors surface over SNS messaging that Hyo-Ahn's back story is not as innocent as it seems. Ho-soo works with Hyo-ahn's classmates that have known her since elementary school.

The series is similar to the original Jungle Fish TV special in that it deals with the subject of teenage hardships and academic pressures.

Cast

Main 
 Hong Jong-hyun as Min Ho-soo 
 Park Ji-yeon as Seo Yool
 Lee Joon as Ahn Ba-woo
 Han Ji-woo as Baek Hyo-Ahn
 Shin So-Yul as Lee Ra-Yi
 Kim Bo-ra as Yoon Gong-ji

Supporting 
 Choi Myung-kyung as Lee Sang-yong
 Lee Mi-so as Yoo Yeo-jin
 Yoon Hee-seok as Jung In-woo
 Kim Dong-beom as Bae Tae-rang
 Ryu Hyo-young as Jeong Yoo-mi
 Go Kyung-pyo as Bong Il-tae
 Jung Kyung-ho as Min Chan-ki
 Choi Woo-hyeok as Speaker
 Shin Seo-hyun as Hong Eun-ja
 Kim So-young as Han Jae-eun
 Kim Jae-woo as Shin Won-tak
 Nam Hyun-joo as Ho-soo's mother
 Jung Man-sik as Ba-woo's father
 Jeon So-min as Ba-woo's date
 Lee Il-hwa as Ra-yi's mother
 Jo Jae-yoon as P.E. Teacher
 Song Eun-jin as Teacher

Original soundtrack

Ratings

Awards and nominations

Media release 
The series was released as a DVD in Japan in May and in Singapore in June 2011.

KBS's official YouTube channel KBS World released the full series on YouTube on 2015. It has amassed over 700,000 views since; making one of the channel's most watched dramas.

International broadcast

References 

2010 South Korean television series debuts
2010 South Korean television series endings
South Korean teen dramas
Korean Broadcasting System television dramas